"River Song" may refer to:

 "River Song" (Dennis Wilson song), the opening track of Dennis Wilson's 1977 album Pacific Ocean Blue
 "River Song" (Sherman), a 1973 song from the movie Tom Sawyer composed by Robert B. Sherman and Richard M. Sherman
 River Songs, the third full-length studio album by American band The Badlees
 River Song: A Novel by Craig Lesley
 River Song (Doctor Who), a recurring character in the Doctor Who TV programme

See also
 River (disambiguation)#Music, for songs titled "River"
 Song River
 The Diary of River Song, an audio play series involving the Doctor Who character
 The River (disambiguation)
 The Song of the Rivers